Brian Lo-A-Njoe is a Dutch mixed martial artist and former kickboxer. Who competes in the Lightweight division. He competed for notable organizations like It's Showtime, Shootboxing S-1 Cup, Pride FC, RINGS, Slamm and M-1 Global

Mixed martial arts record

|-
|-
| Win
| align=center| 6-9-3
| Carlos Diego
| KO
| ROTK 2: Return of the King 2
| 
| align=center| 0
| align=center| 0:00
| Paramaribo, Suriname
| 
|-
| Win
| align=center| 5-9-3
| Sergio Melo
| KO
| ROTK 1: Return of the King 1
| 
| align=center| N/A
| align=center| N/A
| Paramaribo, Suriname
| 
|-
| Loss
| align=center| 4-9-3
| Sergey Verdesh
| Submission (triangle choke)
| M-1 MFC: Battle on the Neva
| 
| align=center| 2
| align=center| N/A
| Saint Petersburg, Russia
| 
|-
| Loss
| align=center| 4-8-3
| Oktay Karatas
| Decision (unanimous)
| GFN: Gentlemen Fight Night
| 
| align=center| N/A
| align=center| N/A
| Tilburg, North Brabant, Netherlands
| 
|-
| Loss
| align=center| 4-7-3
| Cengiz Dana
| KO (liver kick)
| Slamm: Holland vs. Thailand 3
| 
| align=center| 2
| align=center| 0:36
| Netherlands
| 
|-
| Loss
| align=center| 4-6-3
| Shinya Aoki
| Submission (armbar)
| Pride 34: Kamikaze
| 
| align=center| 1
| align=center| 1:33
| Saitama, Japan
| 
|-
| Win
| align=center| 4-5-3
| Oktay Karatas
| Submission (rear-naked choke)
| 2H2H: Pride & Honor
| 
| align=center| 1
| align=center| 7:57
| Rotterdam, South Holland, Netherlands
| 
|-
| Win
| align=center| 3-5-3
| Jesse-Bjorn Buckler
| TKO (injury)
| Slamm: Netherlands Vs.Thailand 2
| 
| align=center| 1
| align=center| 4:51
| Netherlands
| 
|-
| Loss
| align=center| 2-5-3
| Sergei Bytchkov
| Submission (arm-triangle choke)
| 2H2H 4: Simply the Best 4
| 
| align=center| N/A
| align=center| N/A
| Rotterdam, South Holland, Netherlands
| 
|-
| Loss
| align=center| 2-4-3
| Stephan Tapilatu
| Decision (unanimous)
| Rings Holland: Some Like It Hard
| 
| align=center| 2
| align=center| 5:00
| Utrecht, Netherlands
| 
|-
| Loss
| align=center| 2-3-3
| Genki Sudo
| Submission (triangle choke)
| Rings: Battle Genesis Vol. 8
| 
| align=center| 1
| align=center| 2:17
| Tokyo, Japan
| 
|-
| Draw
| align=center| 2-2-3
| Christophe Lardot
| Draw
| Rings Holland: No Guts, No Glory
| 
| align=center| 2
| align=center| 5:00
| Amsterdam, North Holland, Netherlands
| 
|-
| Loss
| align=center| 2-2-2
| Takehiro Murahama
| Submission (kneebar)
| Rings: Battle Genesis Vol. 7
| 
| align=center| 1
| align=center| 4:49
| Tokyo, Japan
| 
|-
| Loss
| align=center| 2-1-2
| Gilbert Ballentine
| TKO (punches and knee)
| Rings Holland: Heroes Live Forever
| 
| align=center| 2
| align=center| 2:09
| Utrecht, Netherlands
| 
|-
| Win
| align=center| 2-0-2
| Jassier Kaderi
| KO (punches)
| Rings Holland: Di Capo Di Tutti Capi
| 
| align=center| 1
| align=center| 2:12
| Utrecht, Netherlands
| 
|-
| Win
| align=center| 1-0-2
| Jeffrey Heijm
| Decision (unanimous)
| Rings Holland: There Can Only Be One Champion
| 
| align=center| 2
| align=center| 5:00
| Utrecht, Netherlands
| 
|-
| Draw
| align=center| 0-0-2
| Alfred Neef
| Draw
| Rings Holland: Judgement Day
| 
| align=center| 3
| align=center| 3:00
| Amsterdam, North Holland, Netherlands
| 
|-
| Draw
| align=center| 0-0-1
| Stephan Tapilatu
| Draw
| Rings Holland: The Thialf Explosion
| 
| align=center| 0
| align=center| 0:00
| Holland
|

Kickboxing record (incomplete)

|-
|-  style="background:#fbb;"
| 2009-05-16 || Loss ||align=left| Murat Direkçi || It's Showtime 2009 Amsterdam || Amsterdam, Netherlands || TKO || 2 || N/A
|-
|-  style="background:#cfc;"
| 2007-10-28 || Win ||align=left| Kenichi Ogata || Shootboxing Battle Summit Ground Zero Tokyo 2007 || Tokyo, Japan || KO (right-hook) || 2 || 0:44
|-
|-
| colspan=9 | Legend:

See also
List of male mixed martial artists

References

External links
 

Dutch male mixed martial artists
Lightweight mixed martial artists
Mixed martial artists utilizing kickboxing
Dutch male kickboxers
Living people
Place of birth missing (living people)
1976 births